John Walker Mitchell (1832 – 23 July 1914) was a Scottish-born New Zealand politician. He immigrated to New Zealand from Australia in 1862. He was a losing candidate in the 1871 Invercargill mayoral election and 1895 Invercargill mayoral election. He was twice mayor of Invercargill (1875–1876, 1889–1890) and served as Councillor for two terms (1873–1875, 1887–1889).

Sources

External links
 Mr. John Walker Mitchell|NZETC
 Brief History of Eastern Cemetery – past mayors

Bibliography
The Statutes of New Zealand, page 20.

1832 births
1914 deaths
Invercargill City Councillors
Mayors of Invercargill
Scottish emigrants to New Zealand
People from Perthshire
Burials at Eastern Cemetery, Invercargill